The secretary of state for health and social care, also referred to as the health secretary, is a secretary of state in the Government of the United Kingdom, responsible for the work of the Department of Health and Social Care. The incumbent is a member of the Cabinet of the United Kingdom.

The position can trace its roots back to the nineteenth century, and has been a secretary of state position since 1968. For 30 years, from 1988 to 2018, the position was titled Secretary of State for Health, before Prime Minister Theresa May added "and Social Care" to the designation in the 2018 British cabinet reshuffle.

The office holder works alongside the other health and social care ministers. The corresponding shadow minister is the shadow secretary of state for health and social care, and the secretary of state is also scrutinised by the Health and Social Care Select Committee.

The current health secretary is Steve Barclay who was appointed by Rishi Sunak on 25 October 2022.

Responsibilities
Corresponding to what is generally known as a health minister in many other countries, the health secretary's remit includes the following:
 Oversight of England's National Health Service, including:
 Delivery of care
 Performance
 Fiscal consolidation
 Financial management
 Matters concerning England's social care policy (although responsibility is shared with the Ministry of Housing Communities and Local Government in respect of adult social care, and the Department for Education in respect of children's social care).
 Matters concerning England's national public health
 Relations with international health partnerships (WHO)

History
The first Boards of Health were created by Orders in Council dated 21 June, 14 November and 21 November 1831. In 1848, a General Board of Health was created with lay members as its leadership and the first commissioner of woods and forests as its president. In 1854, this board was reconstituted and the president appointed separately. However, the board was abolished in 1858 and its function of overseeing the local boards was transferred to a new Local Government Act Office within the Home Office. From 1871, that function was transferred to the new Local Government Board.

The Ministry of Health was created in by the Ministry of Health Act 1919 as a reconstruction of the Local Government Board.  Local government functions were eventually transferred to the minister of housing and local government, leaving the Health Ministry in charge of Health proper.

From 1968, it was amalgamated with the Ministry of Social Security under the secretary of state for social services, until a de-merger of the Department of Health and Social Security on 25 July 1988.

Since devolution in 1999, the position holder's responsibility for the NHS is mainly restricted to the health service in England, with the holder's counterparts in Scotland and Wales responsible for the NHS in Scotland and Wales. Prior to devolution, the secretaries of state for Scotland and Wales had those respective responsibilities, but the Department of Health had a larger role than now in the co-ordination of health policy across Great Britain. Health services in Northern Ireland have always had separate arrangements from the rest of the UK, and are currently the responsibility of the health minister in the Northern Ireland Executive.

A small number of health issues remain reserved matters, that is, they are not devolved.

According to Jeremy Hunt the department receives more letters than any other government department and there are 50 officials in the correspondence unit.

List of ministers

Colour key (for political parties):

See also 

 Health and Social Care minister
 Minister of Health

References

External links

 

Health in the United Kingdom
National Health Service
Ministerial offices in the United Kingdom
 
Health ministers of the United Kingdom